The 1976–77 NBA season was the Rockets' 10th season in the NBA and 6th season in the city of Houston.

In the playoffs, the Rockets defeated the Washington Bullets in six games in the Semifinals before losing to the Philadelphia 76ers in six games in the Conference Finals.

Offseason

Draft picks

 On June 7, 1976, the Houston Rockets acquired Dwight Jones and the first pick from the Atlanta Hawks in exchange for Gus Bailey, Joe Meriweather and the ninth pick. The Rockets used the pick to draft John Lucas. The Hawks used the pick to draft Armond Hill.

Roster

Regular season

Season standings

z – clinched division title
y – clinched division title
x – clinched playoff spot

Record vs. opponents

Game log

Playoffs

|- align="center" bgcolor="#ffcccc"
| 1
| April 19
| Washington
| L 101–111
| Mike Newlin (24)
| Moses Malone (10)
| John Lucas (7)
| The Summit15,458
| 0–1
|- align="center" bgcolor="#ccffcc"
| 2
| April 21
| Washington
| W 124–118 (OT)
| Moses Malone (31)
| Moses Malone (26)
| Mike Newlin (9)
| The Summit15,676
| 1–1
|- align="center" bgcolor="#ffcccc"
| 3
| April 24
| @ Washington
| L 90–93
| Malone, Lucas (18)
| Moses Malone (15)
| John Lucas (8)
| Capital Centre16,842
| 1–2
|- align="center" bgcolor="#ccffcc"
| 4
| April 26
| @ Washington
| W 107–103
| Rudy Tomjanovich (28)
| Moses Malone (13)
| Mike Newlin (7)
| Capital Centre19,035
| 2–2
|- align="center" bgcolor="#ccffcc"
| 5
| April 29
| Washington
| W 123–115
| Calvin Murphy (40)
| Moses Malone (22)
| Mike Newlin (6)
| The Summit15,676
| 3–2
|- align="center" bgcolor="#ccffcc"
| 6
| May 1
| @ Washington
| W 108–103
| Rudy Tomjanovich (26)
| Moses Malone (14)
| Calvin Murphy (9)
| Capital Centre12,393
| 4–2
|-

|- align="center" bgcolor="#ffcccc"
| 1
| May 5
| @ Philadelphia
| L 117–128
| Moses Malone (32)
| Moses Malone (12)
| Calvin Murphy (13)
| Spectrum17,507
| 0–1
|- align="center" bgcolor="#ffcccc"
| 2
| May 8
| @ Philadelphia
| L 97–106
| Calvin Murphy (32)
| Moses Malone (18)
| Mike Newlin (11)
| Spectrum14,855
| 0–2
|- align="center" bgcolor="#ccffcc"
| 3
| May 11
| Philadelphia
| W 118–94
| Moses Malone (30)
| Moses Malone (25)
| John Lucas (9)
| The Summit15,676
| 1–2
|- align="center" bgcolor="#ffcccc"
| 4
| May 13
| Philadelphia
| L 95–107
| Rudy Tomjanovich (24)
| Kevin Kunnert (17)
| John Lucas (14)
| The Summit15,676
| 1–3
|- align="center" bgcolor="#ccffcc"
| 5
| May 15
| @ Philadelphia
| W 118–115
| Tomjanovich, Lucas (21)
| Moses Malone (19)
| Calvin Murphy (10)
| Spectrum18,276
| 2–3
|- align="center" bgcolor="#ffcccc"
| 6
| May 17
| Philadelphia
| L 109–112
| John Lucas (24)
| Moses Malone (16)
| Tomjanovich, Murphy (5)
| The Summit15,676
| 2–4
|-

Awards and records
Tom Nissalke, NBA Coach of the Year Award
Ray Patterson, NBA Executive of the Year Award
John Lucas, NBA All-Rookie Team 1st Team

References

Houston Rockets seasons
Houston